The North Sea Link is a 1,400MW high-voltage direct current submarine power cable between Norway and the United Kingdom.

At  it is the longest subsea interconnector in the world. The cable became operational on 1 October 2021.

Route

The cable runs from Kvilldal, Suldal, in Norway, to Cambois near Blyth in England.
The converter station is located near to the cable landfall in East Sleekburn and is connected to the National Grid at the Blyth substation.

Technical description
The estimated cost of the project was €2billion, and it became operational in 2021, as planned.

Project participants
It is a joint project of the transmission system operators Statnett and National Grid.

The offshore cable was supplied by Prysmian and manufactured at the Arco Felice factory in Naples, Italy. It was installed by the cable-laying vessel Giulio Verne.  Cable for the fjord, tunnel and lake sections, and the onshore connection in Norway, was supplied by Nexans and manufactured at Nexans' plant in Halden, Norway. It was laid by using the Capjet trenching system and the cable-laying vessel Skagerrak.  The HVDC converter stations were built and installed by the ABB Group.

Project history
The project was first proposed in 2003, when Statnett and National Grid planned a 1,200MW interconnector between Suldal in Norway and Easington, County Durham, in the United Kingdom. This project was suspended.

In October 2009, Statnett and National Grid announced they were conducting a feasibility study of the cable. According to the pre-feasibility study the project would be economically and technologically feasible. It would be a commercial cable jointly owned by Statnett and National Grid NSN Link, a subsidiary of National Grid.

In 2010, there was speculation that the interconnection may also connect the North Sea wind farms as well as offshore oil and gas platforms, becoming the backbone of the proposed North Sea Offshore Grid. In 2014, National Grid quoted various groups in favour of more interconnections.

The route survey of the offshore section was conducted by MMT in 2012.

In March 2015, Statnett and National Grid announced a decision to start the construction phase, a month after Nemo link, a similar connection between the United Kingdom and Belgium, was announced. Along with Viking Link from Denmark, they would increase the UK's electricity interconnection level (transmission capacity relative to production capacity) from the 6% it was in 2014.

Construction of the UK on-shore cable between the landfall at Bucca headland and the converter station site at East Sleekburn was completed in February 2020, with the converter station under construction. The cable crossed the  Norwegian trench. A  tunnel was drilled from the fjord through the mountain to the lake Suldalsvatnet, and the cable was floated across the lake to the Kvilldal connection point. , the converter station in Suldal had been connected to the grid.

On 8 June 2021, it was announced that construction had been completed, and after a period of testing the interconnector became operational on 1 October 2021. Initially the link operated at a maximum of 700MW, half its capacity, and then increased to a gigawatt. A flaw in the English converter restricts power for the time being, until the full 1,400MW can be achieved. The interconnector was switched from monopole to bipole operation in January 2022.

Economic effect

Once fully operational, the North Sea Link will give the UK access to the south Norway bidding area of Nord Pool Spot, with an annual transmission capacity of 12.3TWh. According to analysis by the United Kingdom market regulator Ofgem, in the base case scenario the cable would contribute around £490million to the welfare of the United Kingdom and around £330million to the welfare of Norway. In this analysis, over the 25-year cap and floor regime (a regulation for how much money a developer can earn once the interconnector is in operation) the benefit to United Kingdom consumers is expected to be around £3.5billion under the base case scenario. This could reduce the average domestic consumer bill in the United Kingdom by around £2 per year.

According to Auke Lont, CEO of Statnett, Norway may use the interconnector to import electricity at times of peak supply in the United Kingdom, which could allow a temporary reduction in hydroelectric output in Norway and a corresponding increase at peak Norwegian demand times.

In 2014, the Norwegian energy service provider Markedskraft analysed the impact of two interconnectors under construction from Norway: the North Sea Link and NorGer, a submarine cable of identical capacity connecting Norway with Germany. The electricity will at any moment flow towards the country with the highest price and these price differentials generate income for the interconnector whether the electricity flows one way or the other. Markedskraft estimated that while the Norwegian import and export via NorGer will zero out in 2020, the annual net export to the UK via North Sea Link is projected to be about 10TWh, i.e. almost all of the interconnector's annual capacity. Markedskraft go on to estimate that the increased demand for Norwegian electricity via North Sea Link will increase the price of electricity in Norway by 25NOK/MWh (ca. 2.6 €/MWh). A 2016 study expects the two cables to increase price in South Norway by 2øre/kWh, less than other factors. Statnett said in March 2022 that the very high European gas prices were the main factor of the large increase in electricity prices in Southern Norway in late 2021. The two new cables NSL and NordLink, were responsible for €5―15/MWh, or 10% of the increase for the entire year. Statnett predicts more hours with imports of zero price electricity, as the rest of Europe gets more solar and wind power.

See also
Icelink
NorthConnect
NorNed
NeuConnect
NORD.LINK
BritNed

References

External links

Page on 4c

Electrical interconnectors to and from Great Britain
Electrical interconnectors to and from the Nordic grid
HVDC transmission lines
Electrical interconnectors in the North Sea
Norway–United Kingdom relations
2021 establishments in Europe